Angor is an urban-type settlement in Surxondaryo Region, Uzbekistan. It is the administrative center of Angor District.

References

Populated places in Surxondaryo Region
Urban-type settlements in Uzbekistan